The Chalmers executive council was the 16th executive council of British Ceylon. The government was led by Governor Robert Chalmers.

Executive council members

See also
 Cabinet of Sri Lanka

References

1913 establishments in Ceylon
1915 disestablishments in Ceylon
Cabinets established in 1913
Cabinets disestablished in 1915
Ceylonese executive councils
Ministries of George V